The 1955 Texas Tech Red Raiders football team represented Texas Technological College—now known as Texas Tech University—as a member of the Border Conference during the 1955 college football season. Led by fifth-year head coach DeWitt Weaver, the Red Raiders compiled an overall record of 7–3–1 with a mark of3–0–1 in conference play, winning the Border Conference title for the third consecutive season. Texas Tech was invited to the Sun Bowl, where they lost to Wyoming. This was Texas Tech's final season in the Border Conference. The team competed as an independent from 1956 to 1959 before joining the Southwest Conference (SWC) in 1960.

Schedule

References

Texas Tech
Texas Tech Red Raiders football seasons
Border Conference football champion seasons
Texas Tech Red Raiders football